The 1971 NBA playoffs was the postseason tournament of the National Basketball Association's 1970–71 season. The tournament concluded with the Western Conference champion Milwaukee Bucks defeating the Eastern Conference champion Baltimore Bullets four games to none in the NBA Finals.

Led by Finals MVP and the previous season's Rookie of the Year Lew Alcindor and Oscar Robertson, the Bucks became the fastest expansion team in NBA history to win the championship (a record that they still hold as of 2021), and did so in dominating fashion, finishing 12-2 in the playoffs with a postseason average point differential of 14.5.

The playoff format kept the amount of teams qualifying the same, albeit with a different format from the two-division format, since there were now four divisions rather than two, with each division qualifying its champion and second-place team (as opposed to having the top four from the Eastern and Western). In the Conference Semifinals, the champion of each division played the second place team in the other, with the divisional champion having home-court advantage. The two winners then played for the conference championship.

This was the first NBA Finals appearance for the Bullets, and their only trip to the championship round in Baltimore; they made three more appearances (winning one title) later in the decade.

The 1971 playoffs was the last for the San Francisco Warriors under that moniker; the following season, symbolizing their already-established home base of Oakland, they changed their name to the Golden State Warriors.

Bracket

Conference semifinals

Eastern Conference semifinals

(A1) New York Knicks vs. (C2) Atlanta Hawks

This was the first playoff meeting between these two teams.

(C1) Baltimore Bullets vs. (A2) Philadelphia 76ers

 Bailey Howell's final NBA game.

This was the first playoff meeting between these two teams.

Western Conference semifinals

(M1) Milwaukee Bucks vs. (P2) San Francisco Warriors

 All three Milwaukee home games in the series were not played at Milwaukee Arena due to scheduling conflicts.

This was the first playoff meeting between these two teams.

(P1) Los Angeles Lakers vs. (M2) Chicago Bulls

This was the second playoff meeting between these two teams, with the Lakers winning the first meeting.

Conference finals

Eastern Conference finals

(A1) New York Knicks vs. (C1) Baltimore Bullets

 The Bullets become the second team after the Boston Celtics in the 1969 Finals to win Game 7 on the road after the home team won each of the first six games.

This was the third playoff meeting between these two teams, with the Knicks winning the first two meetings.

Western Conference finals

(M1) Milwaukee Bucks vs. (P1) Los Angeles Lakers

This was the first playoff meeting between these two teams.

NBA Finals: (M1) Milwaukee Bucks vs. (C1) Baltimore Bullets

 The Bucks win their first championship in only their third year of existence. This is also the last NBA Finals to date in which the series alternates in between the venues of the competing teams after every game as opposed to the customary 2–2–1–1–1 and 2–3–2 formats that have been used ever since (with the exception of 1975 and 1978 due to scheduling conflicts, which resulted in the use of a 1–2–2–1–1 format).

This was the first playoff meeting between these two teams.

References

External links
 1971 NBA Playoffs Basketball-Reference.com
 April 19, 1971 'Bucks vs Knicks "We've Got to Spread a Little Anarchy"' Sports Illustrated

National Basketball Association playoffs
Playoffs

fi:NBA-kausi 1970–1971#Pudotuspelit